The Shawnee Fossil Plant is a coal-fired power plant owned and operated by the Tennessee Valley Authority, located near Paducah, Kentucky. The closest city is Metropolis, Illinois, across the Ohio River to the northeast. The Shawnee Fossil Plant was created with the intentions of providing sufficient electricity to the national defense industry escalating demand for power which could not be met with the Commonwealth of Kentucky's then-current infrastructure. The plant also provided economic growth to the area in the post-WWII era creating jobs and a stronger infrastructure to support future state developments.

Operation
Shawnee Fossil Plant contains nine active units, which are drum-type, front wall fired pulverized coal units. These units are coal powered and operate by using a boiler to heat water. This heated water in turn creates highly pressurized steam into a turbine to then power the generator.

History
Construction began on the Shawnee Fossil Plant in January 1951. The plant's first unit began operation on April 9, 1953. In October 1956, the last of the ten units began operation. At the time of its completion, it was the second-largest coal-fired plant in the nation, behind TVA's Kingston Fossil Plant in Kingston, Tennessee, and was estimated to be the second-largest coal-fired plant in the world. Shawnee is currently the oldest TVA coal-fired power plant still in operation.

Unit 10, which was converted to an atmospheric fluidized-bed boiler in the early 1980s was idled in October 2010 and retired on June 30, 2014. That unit's generator was moved to TVA's Kingston Fossil Plant late that year, where it replaced a generator that had failed. In total the Shawnee Fossil Plant currently produces enough electricity to power roughly 530,000 homes yearly.

Environmental Consequences 
The Shawnee Fossil Plant has significant consequences on the surrounding environment as their emissions travel through the local ecosystem. Through the analyzation of groundwater monitoring wells surrounding the plant excessive amounts of cobalt, chromium, lead, sulfate, strontium, nickel, manganese, boron, and beryllium were found with toxic levels well above the Environmental Protection Agency's regulations in 16 out of the 19 groundwater monitoring wells. Overall the Shawnee Fossil Plant disposes of ash within a 300-acre area which includes groundwater access locations polluting the local ecosystem. With Unit 10 already decommissioned on June 30, 2014, the president of the Tennessee Valley Authority, Jeff Lyash, announced plans to close the TVA's coal fleet (including the Shawnee Fossil Plant) by 2035 with hopes of transitions to cleaner energy solutions making less of an impact on the surrounding environment.

Environmental Initiatives 
Through the resources of the Tennessee Valley Authority and AECOM the Shawnee Fossil Plant installed scrubbers that remove both sulfur dioxide and nitrogen oxides produced in Units 1 and 4. In addition, this operation was able to reduce mercury emissions as a byproduct. The recent installation of these scrubbers has drawn large public attention and even praise from the energy industry for their benefits on the local public and environment. Despite these steps towards a more environmentally friendly energy solution plans still remain to shut down the Shawnee Fossil Plant along with the surrounding coal plants. The clean energy solutions meant to replace the TVA's coal fleet will not only help ensure the safety of local inhabitants but also provide economic stimulation upon the construction of new facilities and the demolition processes to safely decommission the coal fleet.

See also

 Coal mining in Kentucky
 List of power stations in Kentucky

References

External resources
 

Buildings and structures in McCracken County, Kentucky
Tennessee Valley Authority
Coal-fired power plants in Kentucky
1953 establishments in Kentucky
Energy infrastructure completed in 1953
Energy infrastructure completed in 1954
Energy infrastructure completed in 1955
Energy infrastructure completed in 1956